Asterix and Cleopatra is the sixth book in the Asterix album series by René Goscinny and Albert Uderzo. It was first published in serial form in Pilote magazine, issues 215–257, in 1963.

Synopsis
The book begins with an argument between Cleopatra, Queen of Egypt, and Julius Caesar.  As a triumphant invader, Caesar belittles the Egyptian people and suggests that Egypt, as a realm, is past its best.  Infuriated, Cleopatra makes a wager with Caesar promising to build a new palace in Alexandria within three months. Cleopatra summons Edifis, who claims to be the best architect in Egypt. She promises Edifis that if he builds the palace on time he will be covered with gold; if he fails, he will be a meal for the sacred crocodiles.

Edifis responds to this assignment by enlisting the help of the Gauls, Asterix, Obelix, Getafix, and Dogmatix. Thanks to Getafix and his magic potion, the work goes forward on schedule, despite multiple attempts by Edifis's arch rival, Artifis, to sabotage the construction after Edifis says he doesn't want his help, claiming Artifis works people too hard. Artifis tells the workers to demand less whipping, which would slow construction. However Getafix gives the workers magic potion. Artifis bribes the stone-delivery man to throw his load away, before Obelix beats him up, causing him to reveal the truth, a henchman tries to lock the Gauls inside a pyramid, but Dogmatix helps them find their way out. He subsequently tries to frame the Gauls by sending a poisoned cake to Cleopatra, but Getafix makes an antidote enabling the Gauls to eat it, then cures the taster and claims eating too much rich food was giving him a bad stomach. Edifis is kidnapped and hidden in a sarcophagus in the house of Artifis, but Obelix frees him. Artifis and his henchman are forced to work on the palace, but without magic potion.

Just before the palace is due to be completed, Caesar intervenes by sending legions to try to arrest the Gauls, after he realises the three Gauls are in Egypt when a spy disguises himself as a worker, and sees the effects of the magic potion. The Gauls fight off the Roman soldiers, but the commanding officer proceeds to shell the building with his catapults. In desperation, Asterix and Dogmatix deliver the news to Cleopatra. A furious Cleopatra then hurries to the construction site to berate Caesar. Caesar's legions are ordered to fix the damage they caused (without any magic potion to help them) and the palace is successfully completed on time. Cleopatra wins her bet and covers Edifis with gold. Edifis and Artifis reconcile and agree to build pyramids together, and Cleopatra gives Getafix some papyrus manuscripts from the Library of Alexandria as a gift. The Gauls return, but Vitalstatistix criticises Obelix trying to give an Egyptian style point to menhirs.

Adaptations
Asterix and Cleopatra has been adapted for film twice: first as an animated 1968 film entitled Asterix and Cleopatra, and then as a live-action 2002 film called Asterix & Obelix: Mission Cleopatra.

An audiobook of Asterix and Cleopatra adapted by Anthea Bell and Derek Hockridge and narrated by Willie Rushton was released on Hodder and Stoughton's Hodder Children's Audio.

Relationship to other Asterix books
In most Asterix books, Obelix is not permitted to drink the Magic Potion, because he fell into a cauldron of Magic Potion in his childhood, resulting in a permanent effect, and Getafix fears that giving Obelix any more potion would have an unpredictable effect on him. However, in this book Getafix makes an exception due to an extraordinary requirement (the need to force open a solid stone door inside a pyramid which apparently even Obelix's regular level of strength is incapable of doing). Obelix notices no difference, but keeps asking for more potion in subsequent volumes.

The recurring pirate characters appear in this book, though on this occasion they sink their own ship rather than endure a fight with the Gauls. The captain's son Erix (seen in the previous book Asterix and the Banquet) is mentioned as having been left as a deposit to pay for the short-lived ship. After he and his crew have been forced to take jobs as galley slaves on Cleopatra's barge, the captain expresses the unusual determination to wreak revenge on the Gauls — in other books, he simply wishes never to encounter them again.

Trivia
Obelix's dog, Dogmatix (Idéfix in the original French), is named for the first time in this story. It is also the first story in which Dogmatix takes a significant role (rescuing the heroes from a maze inside a Pyramid).

On Page 33, Artifis is reading the Daily Nile newspaper, which shows the comics - PTARZAN and PNUTS.

On page 47, Asterix offers help in creating a canal linking the Red Sea with the Mediterranean Sea by telling the Egyptians to call someone in the future.

Reception 
On Goodreads, it had a score of 4.29 out of 5.

References

External links 
Asterix and Cleopatra Official English Website

Cleopatra, Asterix and
Depictions of Cleopatra in comics
Depictions of Julius Caesar in comics
Ancient Alexandria in art and culture
Comics set in deserts
Comics set in ancient Egypt
Works originally published in Pilote
Literature first published in serial form
1965 graphic novels
Works by René Goscinny
Comics by Albert Uderzo
Comics based on real people